Brendan "Bubba" Newby (born 9 September 1996) is an Irish-born freestyle skier who represents Ireland in the half-pipe event.

Born in Cork to American parents, he attended Mountain View High School, Utah and competed at Park City, Utah.

Newby competed for Ireland at the 2018 Winter Olympics in Pyeongchang, South Korea and the 2022 Winter Olympics in Beijing, China. He also competed for Ireland at the men's ski halfpipe event at the FIS Freestyle Ski and Snowboarding World Championships 2021 in Aspen, Colorado.

See also
 Ireland at the Winter Olympics

References

External links
  (archive)
 
 
 
 

Irish male freestyle skiers
American male freestyle skiers
1996 births
Living people
Freestyle skiers at the 2018 Winter Olympics
Freestyle skiers at the 2022 Winter Olympics
Olympic freestyle skiers of Ireland
Irish emigrants to the United States
People from Park City, Utah
Irish people of American descent
Sportspeople from County Cork